Barresi is a surname of Italian origin, and can refer to one of many notable people:
Daniele Barresi, Carving Designer, twice world champion
Girolamo Pietraperzia Barresi, 16th-century Sicilian nobleman
Joe Barresi, American record engineer and producer
Paul Barresi, American actor, media personality and Hollywood Fixer 
Phil Barresi, Australian politician
Renato Barresi, Paraguayan engineer

Italian-language surnames